Frederick Hanson (7 April 1872 – 24 September 1917) was an Australian cricketer. He played two first-class matches for Tasmania between 1906 and 1908.

See also
 List of Tasmanian representative cricketers

References

External links
 

1872 births
1917 deaths
Australian cricketers
Tasmania cricketers
Cricketers from Hobart